In Greek mythology, Kydoimos or Cydoemus  (Ancient Greek: Κυδοιμός Kudoimós) was the personification of the din of battle, confusion, uproar and hubbub. He was probably numbered amongst the Makhai, daimones of the battlefield. Kydoimos appears in Aristophanes' Peace as a character.

Mythology 
In the epic poem the Shield of Heracles, attributed to Hesiod, Proioxis was one of the many figures, depicted on Heracles' shield.
In his hands he (Herakles) took his shield, all glittering : no one ever broke it with a blow or crushed it. And a wonder it was to see . . . In the centre was Phobos (Fear) worked in adamant, unspeakable, staring backwards with eyes that glowed with fire. His mouth was full of teeth in a white row, fearful and daunting, and upon his grim brow hovered frightful Eris (Battle-Strife) who arrays the throng of men: pitiless she, for she took away the mind and senses of poor wretches who made war against the son of Zeus . . . Upon the shield Proioxis (Pursuit) and Palioxis (Flight) were wrought, and Homados (Tumult), and Phobos (Panic), and Androktasia (Slaughter). Eris (Battle-Strife) also, and Kydoimos (Confusion) were hurrying about, and deadly Ker (Fate) was there holding one man newly wounded. . .

See also
 Alala
 Alke
 Ioke
 Polemus

Notes

References 
 Aristophanes, Peace from The Complete Greek Drama, vol. 2. Eugene O'Neill, Jr. New York. Random House. 1938. Online version at the Perseus Digital Library.
 Aristophanes, Aristophanes Comoediae edited by F.W. Hall and W.M. Geldart, vol. 1. F.W. Hall and W.M. Geldart. Oxford. Clarendon Press, Oxford. 1907.  Greek text available at the Perseus Digital Library.
 Hesiod, Shield of Heracles from The Homeric Hymns and Homerica with an English Translation by Hugh G. Evelyn-White, Cambridge, MA.,Harvard University Press; London, William Heinemann Ltd. 1914. Online version at the Perseus Digital Library. Greek text available from the same website.
 Homer, The Iliad with an English Translation by A.T. Murray, Ph.D. in two volumes. Cambridge, MA., Harvard University Press; London, William Heinemann, Ltd. 1924. . Online version at the Perseus Digital Library.
 Homer, Homeri Opera in five volumes. Oxford, Oxford University Press. 1920. . Greek text available at the Perseus Digital Library.
 Philostratus the Elder. Imagines, translated by Arthur Fairbanks (1864-1944). Loeb Classical Library Volume 256. London: William Heinemann, 1931. Online version at the Topos Text Project.
 Philostratus the Lemnian (Philostratus Major), Flavii Philostrati Opera. Vol 2. Carl Ludwig Kayser. in aedibus B. G. Teubneri. Lipsiae. 1871. Greek text available at the Perseus Digital Library.
 Quintus Smyrnaeus, The Fall of Troy translated by Way. A. S. Loeb Classical Library Volume 19. London: William Heinemann, 1913. Online version at theio.com
 Quintus Smyrnaeus, The Fall of Troy. Arthur S. Way. London: William Heinemann; New York: G.P. Putnam's Sons. 1913. Greek text available at the Perseus Digital Library.
 Suida, Suda Encyclopedia translated by Ross Scaife, David Whitehead, William Hutton, Catharine Roth, Jennifer Benedict, Gregory Hays, Malcolm Heath Sean M. Redmond, Nicholas Fincher, Patrick Rourke, Elizabeth Vandiver, Raphael Finkel, Frederick Williams, Carl Widstrand, Robert Dyer, Joseph L. Rife, Oliver Phillips and many others. Online version at the Topos Text Project.

Greek war deities
War gods
Greek gods
Personifications in Greek mythology
Daimons